The Renault Duster Oroch (called Renault Oroch since 2022) is a 4-door pickup truck produced by the French manufacturer Renault primarily for the South American market since September 2015. It has four doors, space for five passengers, a  load capacity and a  rear volume.

This is the first Renault-badged pick-up and it creates a new size class for pickup trucks in terms of size, space and doors.

Overview
The Renault Duster Oroch was designed by the Technocentre Renault in France and by the Renault Design América Latina studio in São Paulo, Brazil.

The concept car Renault Duster Oroch was presented at the 2014 São Paulo Motor Show. The Renault Duster Oroch was released officially at the 2015 Buenos Aires Motor Show and has been on sale since September 2015 in South America.

It is powered by either the 1.6 litre or the 2.0 litre petrol engine, mated to 5-speed or 6-speed gearbox respectively. A version with an automatic gearbox was released in 2016.

In April 2022, the Oroch received an update (revised exterior and interior design, new security equipments, new infotainment system). It is powered by either the 1.6 litre 118 hp or the new 1.3 litre turbo 170 hp engine.

Awards
The Renault Duster Oroch has received several "Best Pickup Truck of the Year" awards in 2016 by Revista Autoesporte, Car and Drivers Brasil "CAR Magazin" and 10Best.

References

Duster Oroch
Pickup trucks
Sport utility trucks
Front-wheel-drive vehicles
2010s cars
Cars introduced in 2015